Lachenalia vanzyliae, the van Zyl opal flower, is a species of flowering plant in the genus Lachenalia, native to the southwest Cape Provinces of South Africa. It has gained the Royal Horticultural Society's Award of Garden Merit.

References

vanzyliae
Endemic flora of South Africa
Plants described in 2012